Tomara may refer to:

 Tomara dynasty of Delhi region in northern India
 Tomaras of Gwalior, a dynasty of central India
 Tomara (moth), a genus of moth found in Borneo
 Tomara (Lydia), an ancient town in present-day Turkey